Reggae Donn sa is a reggae music festival held in Mauritius. Reggea Donn sa was first held in 2005, and has since become one of the largest Reggae music festival in the Indian Ocean.

History

Editions

References

Festivals in Mauritius
Music festivals in Asia
Mauritian music
Reggae festivals